Staronakaryakovo (İśke Näkäräk) is a rural locality (a selo) in Staroarzamatovsky Selsoviet, Mishkinsky District, Bashkortostan, Russia. The population was 50 as of 2010. There are 2 streets.

Geography 
Staronakaryakovo is located 26 km northeast of Mishkino (the district's administrative centre) by road. Malonakaryakovo is the nearest rural locality.

References 

Rural localities in Mishkinsky District